Vithal Patil (30 June 1927 – 10 June 2014) was an Indian cricketer. He played two first-class matches for Mumbai between 1956 and 1958. He also played in the Kanga League between 1952 and 1984, taking a record 759 wickets.

References

External links
 

1927 births
2014 deaths
Indian cricketers
Mumbai cricketers
Cricketers from Mumbai